Federico Maracchi (born 5 June 1988) is an Italian footballer who plays as a midfielder for Eccellenza club ASD Zaule Rabuiese.

Club career
He made his professional debut in the Serie B for Triestina in the 2007–08 season.

On 1 July 2022, Maracchi joined fifth-tier Eccellenza club ASD Zaule Rabuiese.

References

External links
 

1988 births
Living people
Footballers from Trieste
Italian footballers
Association football midfielders
Serie B players
Serie C players
U.S. Triestina Calcio 1918 players
A.S.D. Pol. Tamai players
Treviso F.B.C. 1993 players
Venezia F.C. players
Pordenone Calcio players
FeralpiSalò players
Trapani Calcio players
Novara F.C. players